Metello Savino (born 13 May 1963) is an Italian former swimmer who competed in the 1984 Summer Olympics.

References

1963 births
Living people
Italian male swimmers
Italian male freestyle swimmers
Olympic swimmers of Italy
Swimmers at the 1984 Summer Olympics
Mediterranean Games gold medalists for Italy
Mediterranean Games medalists in swimming
Swimmers at the 1983 Mediterranean Games